Toomas Kukk (born 11 June 1971 in Tallinn) is an Estonian botanist.

He has been associated with the Estonian Institute of Zoology and Botany in Estonia since 1991.

He serves as the editor-in-chief of Eesti Loodus since 2001.

In 2014 he was awarded with Fourth Class of Order of the White Star.

Toomas Kukk has written books about Estonian flora.

References

External links
Biography 

21st-century Estonian botanists
1971 births
Living people
People from Tallinn
University of Tartu alumni
Academic staff of the Estonian University of Life Sciences
Recipients of the Order of the White Star, 4th Class
Eesti Loodus editors